Mobilis may refer to:

 Mobilis (Algeria), a mobile telephone operator in Algeria
 Mobilis (Île-de-France), a public transport tariff in the Île-de-France region of France
 Mobilis (Vaud), a public transport tariff network in the Vaud canton of Switzerland
 Mobilis (automaker), a Brazilian micro EV maker
 Mobilis – Protectis Range, software for the Microsoft Tablet PC
 A trade name for the medication piroxicam